Renke is a small village on the right bank of the Sava River in the Municipality of Litija in central Slovenia. The area is part of the traditional region of Lower Carniola. It is now included with the rest of the municipality in the Central Sava Statistical Region.

The local church is dedicated to Saint Nicholas and belongs to the Parish of Polšnik. It was a 16th-century church that was restyled in the Baroque in the late 17th century. The main altar dates to 1661.

References

External links
Renke on Geopedia

Populated places in the Municipality of Litija